The Southern Uí Néill (IPA:[ˈiːˈnʲeːl̪ʲˈanˠˈdʲɛʃcəɾˠtʲ]) were that branch of the Uí Néill dynasty that invaded and settled in the Kingdom of Mide and its associated kingdoms.

In the initial decades two sons of Niall Noigiallach, Lóegaire and Coirpre and their immediate descendants led the dynasty. However, after the murder of Túathal Máelgarb in about 549, it was left to another branch of the family descended from another of Niall's sons – Conall Cremthainne – to continue Uí Néill expansion and consolidate their position. No descendants of either Lugaid mac Lóegairi or Túathal Máelgarb are recorded, and it is not unlikely that they were either erased from the genealogical record, or indeed literally erased from history.

Just as their kinsmen the Northern Uí Néill split into two main branches, so too did the Southern Uí Néill, both being descended from sons of Diarmait mac Cerbaill, Colmán Már and Áed Sláine. The former was the progenitor of the Clann Cholmáin Kings of Mide, while the latter was the eponymous ancestor of the Síl nÁedo Sláine Kings of Brega.

Southern  Uí Néill family tree
                                                     
    Niall Noigíallach, d. 450/455?
    |                   
    |_
    |                       |                |
    |                       |                |                     
    Coirpre                 Lóegaire         Conall Cremthainne  
    |                       |                |
    |                       |                | 
    Cormac Cáech            Lugaid           Fergus Cerball      
    |                       d. 507           |
    |                                        |
    Túathal Máelgarb                         Diarmait mac Cerbaill, died 565.
     died 544/549.                           |
     |__
    |                      |                             |
    |                      |                             |
    Colmán Már, d.555/8    Colmán Bec, d. 587.           Áed Sláine, d.604.
    |                                                    |
    |                                                    |
    Clann Cholmáin dynasty                               Síl nÁedo Sláine dynasty

See also
 Irish kings
 Irish royal families
 Monarchs

Gaels
Gaelic-Irish nations and dynasties